Soulaines-Dhuys is a commune in the Aube department of the Grand Est region of northern France.

Population

See also
Communes of the Aube department

References

Communes of Aube
Aube communes articles needing translation from French Wikipedia